Maurizio Ganz (born 13 October 1968) is an Italian professional football coach and former player who is the manager of AC Milan Women. He played as a striker.

Club career
A Sampdoria youth product, Ganz started his professional career with the Sampdoria senior side in 1985, making his professional debut in Serie A on 14 September 1986; he won a Coppa Italia with the club in 1988. He later moved to Monza in Serie B during the 1988–89 season, before helping Parma A.C. to Serie A promotion from Serie B during the 1989–90 season. He spent two more seasons in Serie B, and later played for Brescia, finishing the 1991–92 Serie B season as the top goal-scorer, with 19 goals, and helping the club win the league title, earning promotion to Serie A. In the summer of 1992 he transferred to Atalanta, making his Serie A debut with the club, and scoring 14 goals during his first season in the top division. He spent three seasons with the club, although Atalanta were relegated during his second season, and he passed his final season in Serie B.

Ganz transferred to Internazionale in 1995, spending two seasons with the club; Ganz scored 36 goals from 68 appearances for the club, and was a feared goalscorer, earning the nickname "he always scores!" During his first season, he scored 13 goals in Serie A. The following season, he helped Inter to reach the final of the 1996–97 UEFA Cup, only to lose on penalties; he finished the tournament as the top goalscorer with 8 goals. That season, he also helped Inter to a third-place finish in Serie A, scoring 11 goals, and he helped his club reach the semi-finals of the Coppa Italia, scoring a goal in the competition. In total he scored 10 goals in 16 appearances in European Competitions, and 3 goals in 14 appearances in the Coppa Italia, during his time at Inter. He scored twice in early stages of the 1997–98 UEFA Cup that Inter eventually won.

Ganz moved to local rivals AC Milan in December 1997, helping the club to the 1998 Coppa Italia final during his first season with the club. In his second season, he won the Scudetto with Milan and was very influential, scoring several important goals, including one against his former team Inter in a memorable 5–0 win in a Milan Derby cup tie. His third season was less successful, as Milan were defeated by Parma in the 1999 Supercoppa Italiana final. Ganz did not find much space in the squad that season, and spent a lot of his time on the bench, as Alberto Zaccheroni, the Milan manager at that time, had several other star offensive players, such as Oliver Bierhoff, George Weah, Andriy Shevchenko, Leonardo, and Zvonimir Boban.

During the second half of the 1999–2000 Serie A season, he went on loan to Venezia. He spent the first half of the 2000–01 season with Atalanta before eventually moving on to Fiorentina for the second half of the season, as a replacement for the injured Enrico Chiesa. He later played for two seasons with Ancona in Serie B, helping the club to gain Serie A promotion in 2003, for the first time in 11 years. He moved to Modena for the 2004–05 Serie B season, and later spent a single Lugano in the Swiss Challenge League, scoring 11 goals. He ended his career in 2007 with Pro Vercelli in Serie C2, scoring 10 goals. Ganz finished his career with an impressive record of 204 goals in 469 games.

International career
Ganz represented Italy at the Under-17 World Cup in 1985. He received two call-ups for the Italian national team in 1993, but did not gain an international cap.

He played one game and scored a hat-trick for Padania, an unofficial national team that competes in the Viva World Cup.

Personal life
His son Simone Andrea (born 1993) is a forward who is currently part of Ascoli. He is of Austrian origin.

Career statistics

Managerial

Honours

Player
Sampdoria
 Coppa Italia: 1987–88

Brescia
 Serie B: 1991–92

Inter Milan
 UEFA Cup: 1997–98

AC Milan
 Serie A: 1998–99

Individual
 Serie B top scorer: 1991–92
 UEFA Cup top scorer: 1996–97

References

External links
 FIGC  
 

1968 births
Living people
People from Tolmezzo
Italian people of Austrian descent
Association football forwards
Italian footballers
Serie A players
Serie B players
Serie C players
Swiss Challenge League players
U.C. Sampdoria players
A.C. Monza players
Parma Calcio 1913 players
Brescia Calcio players
Atalanta B.C. players
Inter Milan players
A.C. Milan players
Venezia F.C. players
ACF Fiorentina players
A.C. Ancona players
Modena F.C. players
F.C. Pro Vercelli 1892 players
FC Lugano players
UEFA Cup winning players
Italy youth international footballers
Italian expatriate footballers
Italian expatriate sportspeople in Switzerland
Expatriate footballers in Switzerland
Serie A (women's football) managers
Footballers from Friuli Venezia Giulia